Sir Andrew Gourlay Clow, KCSI, CIE (29 April 1890 – 31 December 1957) was a British colonial administrator in India. He was a specialist in labour conditions in India. Clow was member for Communications on the Viceroy’s Council until his appointment as Governor of Assam from 1942 to 1947, the last British-born governor.

Early life 
Andrew Clow was born in Aberdeen. He was the elder son of Rev. W. M. Clow, a minister of the South Church, Aberdeen. Rev. Clow was also the Principal at the United Free Church College, Glasgow.

Career 
He represented the Indian Government as a delegate at the International Labour Conferences at Geneva. He was the Deputy Secretary to the Government of India from 1924 to 1927 and Joint Secretary (Industries and Labour) from 1931 to 1935. From 1938 to 1942, he was a member of the Viceroy's Executive Council responsible for Communications. He was knighted in 1939.

After Indian independence, Clow returned to Britain. At the age of 58, while being the chief of the Scottish Gas Board, he was appointed the member of the new Gas Council. He was a member of the Restrictive Practices Court from 1957.

References 

Governors of Assam
1890 births
1957 deaths
People from Aberdeen
Knights Commander of the Order of the Star of India
Companions of the Order of the Indian Empire
Indian Civil Service (British India) officers
People educated at Merchiston Castle School
Alumni of St John's College, Cambridge
Members of the Council of the Governor General of India
British people in colonial India